Carry On Emmannuelle is a 1978 British comedy film, the 30th release in the series of 31 Carry On films (1958–1992). The film was to be the final Carry On for many regulars, including Kenneth Williams (in his 26th Carry On), Kenneth Connor (in his 17th), Joan Sims (in her 24th) and Peter Butterworth (in his 16th). Jack Douglas is the only regular from this film to bridge the gap to Carry On Columbus. Beryl Reid, Henry McGee and Suzanne Danielle make their only appearances in the series here. The film featured a change in style, becoming more openly sexual and explicit. This was highlighted by the implied behaviour of Danielle's character, though she does not bare any more flesh than any other Carry On female lead. These changes brought the film closer to the then popular series of X-rated Confessions... comedies, or indeed the actual Emmanuelle films that it parodies. This film, as well as the original cut of Carry On England were the only films in the series to be certified AA by the British Board of Film Censors, which restricted audiences to those aged 14 and over.

Plot
Emmannuelle Prévert (Suzanne Danielle) relieves the boredom of a flight on Concorde by seducing timid Theodore Valentine (Larry Dann). She returns home to London to surprise her husband, the French ambassador, Émile Prevert (Kenneth Williams) but first surprises the butler, Lyons (Jack Douglas). He removes her coat, only to find that she has left her dress on the aircraft. The chauffeur, Leyland (Kenneth Connor), housekeeper, Mrs Dangle (Joan Sims), and aged boot-boy, Richmond (Peter Butterworth), sense saucy times ahead… and they are right! Émile is dedicated to his bodybuilding, leaving a sexually frustrated Emmannuelle to find pleasure with everyone from the Lord Chief Justice (Llewellyn Rees) to chat show host, Harold Hump (Henry McGee). Theodore is spurned by Emmannuelle, who has genuinely forgotten their airborne encounter, and, despite reassurances from his mother (Beryl Reid), exacts revenge by revealing Emmannuelle's antics to the press. However, after a visit to her doctor (Albert Moses), she discovers that she is pregnant and decides to settle down to a faithful marriage with Émile… and dozens of children.

Cast
 Kenneth Williams as Émile Prévert
 Suzanne Danielle as Emmannuelle Prévert
 Kenneth Connor as Leyland
 Jack Douglas as Lyons
 Joan Sims as Mrs. Dangle
 Peter Butterworth as Richmond
 Larry Dann as Theodore Valentine
 Beryl Reid as Mrs. Valentine
 Henry McGee as Harold Hump
 Victor Maddern as Man in Launderette
 Dino Shafeek as Immigration Officer
 Eric Barker as Ancient General
 Joan Benham as Cynical Lady
 Albert Moses as Doctor
 Robert Dorning as Prime Minister
 Steve Plytas as Arabian Official
 Michael Nightingale as Police Commissioner
 Bruce Boa as U.S. Ambassador
 Llewellyn Rees as Lord Chief Justice
 Jack Lynn as Admiral
 Claire Davenport as Blonde in Pub
 Norman Mitchell as Drunken Husband
 Tricia Newby as Nurse in Surgery
 James Fagan as Concorde Steward
 Malcolm Johns as Sentry
 Howard Nelson as Harry Hernia
 Tim Brinton as BBC Newscaster
 Corbett Woodall as ITN Newscaster
 Marianne Maskell as Nurse in Hospital
 Louise Burton as Girl at Zoo
 Gertan Klauber as German Soldier
 John Carlin as French Parson
 Guy Ward as Dandy
 John Hallet as Substitute Football Player
 Deborah Brayshaw as French Buxom Blonde
 Suzanna East as Colette
 Bruce Wylie as Football Referee
 Philip Clifton as Injured Footballer
 Stanley McGeagh as Fleet Street Journalist
 Bill Hutchinson as 1st Reporter
 Neville Ware as 2nd Reporter
 Jane Norman as 3rd reporter
 Nick White as Sent-off Footballer

Crew
Screenplay – Lance Peters
Music – Eric Rogers
Song – Kenny Lynch
Performers – Masterplan
Director of Photography – Alan Hume
Editor – Peter Boita
Art Director – Jack Sampan
Production Manager – Roy Goddard
Camera Operator – Godfrey Godar
Make-up – Robin Grantham
Production Executive for Cleves – Donald Langdon
Assistant Director – Gregory Dark
Sound Recordists – Danny Daniel & Otto Snel
Continuity – Marjorie Lavelly
Wardrobe – Margaret Lewin
Stills Cameraman – Ken Bray
Hairdresser – Betty Sherriff
Costume Designer – Courtenay Elliott
Set Dresser – John Hoesli
Assistant Editor – Jack Gardner
Dubbing Editor – Peter Best
Titles & Opticals – GSE Ltd
Processor – Technicolor Ltd
Producer – Peter Rogers
Director – Gerald Thomas

Filming and locations

Filming dates – 10 April-15 May 1978

Interiors:
 Pinewood Studios, Buckinghamshire

Exteriors:
 Wembley, London
 Trafalgar Square, London
 Oxford Street, London
 London Zoo, London

Critical reception
Critical response was universally negative, even more so than Carry on England which preceded it, and Carry On Columbus which succeeded it 14 years later. Philip French said of it: "This relentless sequence of badly-written, badly-timed dirty jokes is surely one of the most morally and aesthetically offensive pictures to emerge from a British studio." Christopher Tookey considered the film to be "embarrassingly feeble".

Whilst many other Carry Ons have continued to be popular, opinions of Carry on Emmanuelle and its immediate predecessor and successor have not improved over the passing of time, and Carry On Emmanuelle is universally considered to be the worst film in the series. Tom Cole, writing in the Radio Times, found it "undignified" and "laugh-free", noting that the Lolita-esque performance of Suzanne Danielle was "unintentionally creepy". And both Cole and Ian Freer, writing for Empire, laid the blame for the death of the series squarely at the film's door.

Notes

References
 Robert Ross The Carry On Companion, Batsford Books, 1996
 Simon Sheridan Keeping the British End Up: Four Decades of Saucy Cinema, Titan Books, 2011 (fourth edition)

Bibliography

Sheridan, Simon (2011). Keeping the British End Up: Four Decades of Saucy Cinema (fourth edition). Titan Books.

External links 
 
 Carry On Emmannuelle at The Whippit Inn

1978 films
Emmannuelle
1970s English-language films
Films directed by Gerald Thomas
British parody films
British sex comedy films
1970s sex comedy films
Films shot at Pinewood Studios
Emmanuelle
Films produced by Peter Rogers
1978 comedy films
1970s British films
1970s French films